Azghar is a small town and rural commune in Sidi Slimane Province, Rabat-Salé-Kénitra, Morocco. At the time of the 2004 census, the commune had a total population of 9972 people living in 1475 households.

References

Populated places in Sidi Slimane Province
Rural communes of Rabat-Salé-Kénitra